Liu Zige (born March 31, 1989 in Benxi, Liaoning) is a world record holding swimmer from China. She swam for China at the 2008 Olympics, where she won the women's 200m butterfly in a new world record of 2:04.18.

Career

She won the women's 200 m butterfly Gold medal at the 2008 Summer Olympics in Beijing. In the final, she clocked a time of 2:04.18, breaking Jessicah Schipper's world record by over 1 second, and won China's only gold medal in swimming at the Games.  Her teammate, Jiao Liuyang, took the silver in 2:04.72, also under the former world mark. Schipper took the bronze in 2:06.26.

Liu's win was considered a big upset, as she was relatively unknown prior to the Beijing Games. She made her international debut at the 2005 World Championships, where she placed 20th in the 200 m butterfly at 2:14.25. She progressed steadily afterwards, and prior to the Olympics, her best time was 2:07.76, from the Chinese Olympics Trials.

Liu, nicknamed "Lucy," spent some time training under Jessicah Schipper's swimming coach, Ken Wood, and Wood sold Schipper's training program to Liu's coach. She would eventually beat Schipper and broke her world record in 200 meter butterfly during the 2008 Summer Olympics.

In 2009, Liu regained the 200m butterfly world record from Schipper at the Chinese National Games, with a time of 2:01:81 to win the gold medal. She later added the short course world record at the World Cup in Stockholm (2:02:50). She then even shortened that time in the next meet at Berlin with the time of 2:00.78.

Major achievements
2007 National Champions Tournament – 1st 200 m butterfly
2008 Beijing Olympics women's 200 m butterfly Gold
2009 World Aquatics Championships – 2nd Women's 200 m butterfly
2013 World Aquatics Championships – 1st Women's 200 m butterfly

See also
China at the 2012 Summer Olympics – Swimming

References

External links
 http://2008teamchina.olympic.cn/index.php/personview/personsen/5347

1989 births
Living people
Chinese female butterfly swimmers
Olympic gold medalists for China
Olympic swimmers of China
People from Benxi
Swimmers at the 2008 Summer Olympics
Swimmers at the 2012 Summer Olympics
World record setters in swimming
World record holders in swimming
World Aquatics Championships medalists in swimming
Swimmers from Liaoning
Medalists at the FINA World Swimming Championships (25 m)
Medalists at the 2008 Summer Olympics
Swimmers at the 2014 Asian Games
Olympic gold medalists in swimming
Asian Games competitors for China
21st-century Chinese women